The Collective Now is an album released in September 2007 by The Seldon Plan. It is their second album, following on from their 2005 debut album, Making Circles. It is produced by Frank Marchand, and features vocals and guitar by Michael Nestor and Bobby Landle, and drums and percussion by Mike Landavere.

The album
The album is described as having eleven "highly melodic, totally tuneful songs buttressed by rushing, bright electric guitars". It is produced by Frank Marchand with vocals and guitar by Michael Nestor and Bobby Landle, drums and percussion by Mike Landavere and mastering by Charlie Pilzer. Its genre is pop/rock and the total duration is 34:25 minutes.

Track listing
 "Going Nowhere Slow" - 3:20
 "Colored Lenses" - 3:43
 "This Bedroom Prayer" - 3:02
 "Modern Vigil" - 2:21
 "Poem for the Middle Class" - 3:17
 "Seraphim" - 3:31
 "Brandywine Situation" - 3:22
 "Saint Barnabas" - 3:53
 "Dance, Despite the Obvious" 	- 3:38
 "All the Real Girls" 	- 2:43
"Oella" - 1:35

References

2007 albums
The Seldon Plan albums